St. Mary's Airpark  is a privately owned, public use airport in Pottawatomie County, Kansas, United States. It is located four nautical miles (7 km) north of the central business district of St. Marys, Kansas.

Facilities and aircraft 
St. Mary's Airpark has one runway designated 18/36 with a turf and gravel surface measuring 2,514 by 60 feet (766 x 18 m).

For the 12-month period ending September 30, 2008, the airport had 550 aircraft operations, an average of 45 per month: 54.5% general aviation and 45.5% military.

References

External links 
 Aerial photo as of February 2002 from USGS The National Map via MSR Maps
 Aeronautical chart from SkyVector

Airports in Kansas
Buildings and structures in Pottawatomie County, Kansas